The 2012 Waratah Cup was the 10th season of the knockout competition under the Waratah Cup name. The preliminary round for the competition commenced on 23 March 2012.

The champions were Sutherland Sharks – their second title (including the Statewide Cup competition) – who beat APIA Leichhardt Tigers in the Cup Final.

Preliminary round
The draw was announced on 23 March 2012.

 Teams receiving a Bye into the First Round : Canberra FC, Inter Lions, Dee Why, Dapto Dandaloo, Mountains United, Liverpool Sports Club, Hawkesbury City, Sans Souci, Bulli, Nepean FC, Tarrawanna, Doonside Hawks, Enfield Rovers, Prospect United, Chullora Wolves.

First round

Second round

Third round

The twenty winners from Round Two were joined by the twelve clubs from the NSW Premier League.

Fourth round

Quarter finals

The quarter final draw was conducted on 23 May 2012.

Semi-finals

The semi final draw was conducted on 8 June 2012.

Grand final

References

External links

Waratah Cup
1